The Senior is the fourth studio album by American singer Ginuwine. It was  released in the United States on April 8, 2003, via Epic Records. The album was primarily produced by Bryan-Michael Cox, with additional production from Scott Storch, R. Kelly, and Joe Little III. The album debuted at  6 on the US Billboard 200 with first-week sales of 122,000 copies and was certified Gold by the Recording Industry Association of America (RIAA). Three singles were released from the album with all of them appearing on the Billboard Hot 100: "Hell Yeah" peaking at No. 17, "In Those Jeans" peaking at No. 8, and "Love You More" peaking at No. 78.

In an interview with 106 & Park, Ginuwine said that Missy Elliott and Tweet were among the producers for the album, however their contributions never made the final cut.

Critical reception

The Senior received generally favorable reviews from music critics, averaging a 60 out of a 100 among averaged reviews on Metacritic. Allmusic editor John Bush wrote the album "finds the R&B jack-of-all-trades attempting to get in on the game with tracks that mine urban lingo for potential hit combinations [...] As before, Ginuwine rises above most of his dozens of imitators in the contemporary R&B realm, with a set of productions that fit his voice perfectly and rate as slightly edgier than the norm." Entertainment Weeklys Craig Seymour found that "on the finest tracks of his fourth set, R&B balladeer Ginuwine delivers cliched slow jams with convincing emotion. But too much of the album skews toward the dance floor rather than the bedroom, with Ginuwine’s vocals lost in a routine groove. He calls this The Senior, but it’s sophomoric, at best." Vibe magazine remarked that "not much has changed for Ginuwine since his debut. He's still racing R. Kelly to see who can sing the ladies out of their panties first."

Commercial performance
The Senior debuted and peaked at number six on the US Billboard 200, selling 122,000 copies in its first week, a little shy of the 152,000 copies Ginuwine's 2001 album The Life had debuted with.  On Billboards component charts, it became his first album to top the Top R&B/Hip-Hop Albums chart. The Senior was eventually certified gold by the Recording Industry Association of America (RIAA) for the shipment of over 500,000 copies in the United States. By November 2005, the album had sold over 863,000 units, according to Nielsen Soundscan.

Track listing

Notes
 denotes additional producer
 denotes co-producer

Charts

Weekly charts

Year-end charts

Certifications

References

External links

2003 albums
Albums produced by Bryan-Michael Cox
Albums produced by Scott Storch
Albums produced by R. Kelly
Albums produced by Troy Taylor (record producer)
Ginuwine albums
Epic Records albums